Tom Edge is a British screenwriter, best known for creating the submarine thriller Vigil.

Career
Edge created and served as the lead writer on the sitcom Lovesick. The series focused on a group of English friends sharing a house in the West End of Glasgow and their romances. Lovesick began as a programme for Channel 4, before being acquired by Netflix. He also wrote on the second series of The Crown, as well as the second, third and fourth series of Strike. He wrote the 2019 biopic Judy, about the later life of Hollywood actress Judy Garland and her declining health. It starred, and later won an Academy Award for, Renée Zellweger.

According to a 2021 interview, Edge was approached by producer George Aza-Selinger to develop a submarine project. It became Vigil and, produced by World Productions, it began broadcasting on BBC One on 29 August 2021. Vigil became the BBC’s most watched new drama of the year, with its first episode attracting 10.2 million viewers across its first seven days.

References

External links
 

Living people
21st-century British novelists
British television writers
English television writers
English screenwriters
English male screenwriters
British male television writers
21st-century British screenwriters
21st-century English male writers
Year of birth missing (living people)